Grelle is a surname. Notable people with the surname include:

Burchard Grelle (died 1344), German Roman Catholic bishop
Jim Grelle (1936–2020), American middle-distance runner
Josh Grelle (born 1985), American voice actor and writer

See also
Grella